Arturo Cavero Calisto was a Peruvian politician in the late 1970s. He was the mayor of Lima from 1975 to 1977. He was a strong advocate of women's rights.

References

Cavero Calixto Arturo
Living people
Year of birth missing (living people)